Summvs is the fifth collaboration album between Alva Noto and Ryuichi Sakamoto. The record was released on 9 May 2011 via Raster-Noton label.

Background
The collaboration between the artists began in 2002, and Summvs promises to be the fifth and final installment in the series titled the Virus Series. The title Summvs refers to the Latin word "summa" (eng. sum) and "versus" (eng. towards); it serves as a metaphor for the work being oriented towards a collaborative result. The album features "Microon" compositions containing recordings of a 16th tone interval tuning piano—Piano Metamorfoseador Carrillo en Dieciseisavos de Tono. The album also features two covers of the track "By This River" originally composed by Brian Eno, Dieter Moebius, and Hans-Joachim Roedelius in 1977.

The initial letters of the five albums in the series—Vrioon (2002), Insen (2005), Revep (2006), utp_ (2008), and Summvs (2011)—together form the word "Virus".

Reception
Mark Jarnes of The Japan Times commented "Sakamoto’s haunting piano-based arrangements — as well as his masterful understanding of silence — effortlessly coalesce with Nicolai’s digital rhythms and accompaniment, creating a work of musical art that is as provocative as it is meditative. OK, so technically because this album was pressed by German label Raster-Noton, it’s not strictly a Japanese release. However, Sakamoto’s contribution makes it a significant step forward for Japan’s avant-garde scene — not just musically, but also artistically".

Track listing

Personnel
Grand Piano – Ryuichi Sakamoto
Music – Alva Noto (tracks: 1 to 6, 8, 9), Ryuichi Sakamoto (tracks: 1 to 6, 8, 9)
Piano – Conrad Hensel, Fernando Aponte, Yoshifumi Iio

References

External links
Review by Dusted Magazine

2011 albums
Alva Noto albums
Ryuichi Sakamoto albums
Collaborative albums
Raster-Noton albums